Ptilotus rotundifolius (F.Muell.) F.Muell. is a pink-flowered species of shrub in the genus Ptilotus R.Br. (Amaranthaceae). It is commonly known as "royal mulla mulla". It is native to the Gascoyne, Murchison and Pilbara IBRA regions of Western Australia.

References

rotundifolius
Endemic flora of Western Australia
Eudicots of Western Australia
Taxa named by Ferdinand von Mueller